Una mujer sin filtro is a 2018 Mexican comedy film directed by Luis Eduardo Reyes and starring Fernanda Castillo. It is an adaptation on the Chilean film created by Nicolás López titled No Filter. The film premiered on January 12, 2018 in Mexico.

Plot 
Paz (Fernanda Castillo) is a beautiful woman who, out of kindness, has allowed everyone around her to treat her as if she were worthless, keeping silent what she thinks so as not to hurt feelings. Until one day, in her head, an irremediable phenomenon suppresses her social filter making her part of that 1% and forcing her to express what she really feels.

Cast 
 Fernanda Castillo as Paz López
 Carmen Aub as Emilia
 Eugenio Bartilotti as Psiquiatra
 Sofia Niño de Rivera as Dominica
 Nicolás López as Amigo extraño
 Ariel Levy
 Flavio Medina
 Alejandro Calva

References

External links 
 

2018 films
2018 comedy films
Mexican comedy films

2010s Spanish-language films
2010s Mexican films
Remakes of Chilean films